The Great Debaters is a 2007 American biographical drama film directed by and starring Denzel Washington. It is based on an article written about the Wiley College debate team by Tony Scherman for the spring 1997 issue of American Legacy.

The film co-stars Forest Whitaker, Denzel Whitaker, Kimberly Elise, Nate Parker, Gina Ravera, Jermaine Williams and Jurnee Smollett. The screenplay is written by Robert Eisele, with story by Robert Eisele and Jeffrey Porro. The film was released in theaters on December 25, 2007.

Plot
Based on a true story, the plot revolves around the efforts of debate coach Melvin B. Tolson at Wiley College, a historically black college related to the Methodist Episcopal Church, South  (now The United Methodist Church), to place his team on equal footing with whites in the American South during the 1930s, when Jim Crow laws were common and lynch mobs were a fear for blacks. The Wiley team eventually succeeds to the point where they are able to debate Harvard University. (In 1935, the Wiley College debate team defeated the reigning national debate champion, the University of Southern California, depicted as Harvard University in The Great Debaters.)

The movie explores social constructs in Texas during the Great Depression, from day-to-day insults African Americans endured to lynching. Also depicted is James Farmer, who, at 14 years old, was on Wiley's debate team after completing high school (and who later went on to co-found the Congress of Racial Equality). Another character on the team, Samantha Booke, is based on the real individual Henrietta Bell Wells, acclaimed poet and the only female member of the 1930 Wiley team who participated in the first collegiate interracial debate in the US.

The key line of dialogue, used several times, is a famous paraphrase of theologian St. Augustine of Hippo: "An unjust law is no law at all", which would later be the central thesis of Letter from a Birmingham Jail, by Martin Luther King Jr. Another major line, repeated in slightly different versions according to context, concerns doing what you "have to do" in order that we "can do" what we "want to do." In all instances, these vital lines are spoken by the James L. Farmer Sr. and James L. Farmer Jr. characters.

Historical notes 
The film depicts the Wiley Debate team beating Harvard College in the 1930s. The real Wiley team instead defeated the University of Southern California, who at the time were the reigning debating champions. Though they beat the reigning champions, Wiley was not allowed to officially call themselves champions, because they were not full members of the debate society; black people were not admitted until after World War II.

Cast
 Denzel Washington as Melvin B. Tolson
 Forest Whitaker as James L. Farmer Sr.
 Denzel Whitaker as James L. Farmer Jr.
 Nate Parker as Henry Lowe
 Jurnee Smollett as Samantha Booke
 Jermaine Williams as Hamilton Burgess
 Gina Ravera as Ruth Tolson
 John Heard as Sheriff Dozier
 Kimberly Elise as Pearl Farmer
 Devyn A. Tyler as Helen Farmer
 Trenton McClain Boyd as Nathaniel Farmer 
 Jackson Walker as Pig Owner
 Tim Parati as Pig Farmer 
 Justice Leak as Harland Osbourne
 Robert X. Golphin as Dunbar Reed
 Damien Leake as Wilson
 Frank L. Ridley as Security Guard
 Glen Powell as Preston Whittington

Release
The Great Debaters was released in theaters on December 25, 2007.

The release of the film coincided with a nationally stepped-up effort by urban debate leagues to get hundreds of inner-city and financially challenged schools to establish debate programs. Cities of focus included Denver, Philadelphia, and San Francisco.

On December 19, 2007, Denzel Washington announced a $1 million donation to Wiley College so they could re-establish their debate team. June 2007, after completing filming at Central High School, Grand Cane, Louisiana, Washington donated $10,000 to Central High School.

Home media
The Great Debaters was released on DVD on May 13, 2008 on 1-disc and 2-disc editions. In the 2-disc edition, the first disc includes no extra material, but the second disc includes an audio commentary, a making of documentary, deleted scenes, featurettes, and a still gallery.

The film was the first since 1979 allowed to film on Harvard's campus.

Reception

Box office
The Great Debaters debuted at No. 11 in its first weekend with a total of $6,005,180 from 1,171 venues. The film grossed $30,236,407 in the US.

Critical response
As of November 20, 2012, the review aggregator Rotten Tomatoes reports that 80% of critics gave the film positive reviews based on 132 reviews. The site's consensus reads: "A wonderful cast and top-notch script elevate The Great Debaters beyond a familiar formula for a touching, uplifting drama." Metacritic reported the film had an average score of 65 out of 100 based on reviews from 32 critics.

Carrie Rickey of The Philadelphia Inquirer named it the 5th best film of 2007 and Roger Ebert of the Chicago Sun-Times named it the 9th best film of 2007.

Some critics have criticized the film for "playing it safe." John Monaghan of the Detroit Free Press stated, "Serious moviegoers, especially those attracted by the movie's aggressive Oscar campaign, will likely find the package gorgeously wrapped, but intellectually empty."

Motion picture-historian Leonard Maltin, however, hailed the movie as "Inspiring...plays with the facts but, despite its at-times-formulaic storytelling, shows us how education and determination can help ordinary people surmount even the most formidable obstacles."

Accolades
 Won: Image Award for Outstanding Motion Picture
 Won: Image Award for Outstanding Actor in a Motion Picture: Denzel Washington
 Won: Image Award for Outstanding Actress in a Motion Picture: Jurnee Smollett
 Won: Image Award for Outstanding Supporting Actor in a Motion Picture: Forest Whitaker, Nate Parker, Denzel Whitaker
 Won: Stanley Kramer Award
 Nominated: Golden Globe Award for Best Motion Picture – Drama
 Nominated: Image Award for Outstanding Director in a Motion Picture: Denzel Washington
 Nominated: Golden Reel Award for Best Music Sound Editing in a Feature Film

Soundtrack
The songs for the soundtrack to the film were hand-picked by Denzel Washington from over 1000 candidates. It contains remakes of traditional blues and gospel songs from the 1920s and 1930s by artists including Sharon Jones, Alvin Youngblood Hart, David Berger, and the Carolina Chocolate Drops. It features favorites, such as "Step It Up and Go", "Nobody's Fault But Mine", and the Duke Ellington classic, "Delta Serenade". Varèse Sarabande released a separate album of the film's score, composed by James Newton Howard and Peter Golub.

The complete soundtrack album includes the following songs:

 Track listing 
 "My Soul is a Witness" – Alvin "Youngblood" Hart & Sharon Jones
 "That's What My Baby Likes" – Sharon Jones, Alvin Youngblood Hart & Teenie Hodges
 "I've Got Blood in My Eyes for You" – The Carolina Chocolate Drops & Alvin "Youngblood" Hart
 "Step It Up and Go" – Alvin "Youngblood" Hart & Teenie Hodges
 "It's Tight Like That" – Sharon Jones, Alvin Youngblood Hart & Teenie Hodges
 "Busy Bootin'" – Alvin "Youngblood" Hart & The Carolina Chocolate Drops
 "City of Refuge" – Alvin "Youngblood" Hart & The Carolina Chocolate Drops
 "Two Wings" – Alvin "Youngblood" Hart, Sharon Jones w/Billy Rivers and the Angelic Voices of Faith
 "Delta Serenade" – David Berger & The Sultans of Swing
 "Rock n' Rye" – David Berger & The Sultans of Swing
 "Wild About That Thing" – Sharon Jones, Alvin Youngblood Hart, & Teenie Hodges
 "Nobody's Fault but Mine" – Alvin "Youngblood" Hart & The Carolina Chocolate Drops
 "How Long Before I Change My Clothes" – Alvin "Youngblood" Hart
 "We Shall Not Be Moved" – Sharon Jones w/Billy Rivers and the Angelic Voices of Faith
 "Up Above My Head" – Sharon Jones w/Billy Rivers and the Angelic Voices of Faith
 "The Shout" – Art Tatum
 "Begrüssung" – Marian Anderson

References

  Original article about Melvin Tolson's Wiley College debate team.
  Another very detailed article on the team and the film.

External links

 
 
 
 
 
 

2007 films
2007 biographical drama films
African-American biographical dramas
Debating
Biographical films about educators
Films about racism
Films set in Texas
Films set in Boston
Films set in Harvard University
Films set in the 1930s
Films shot in Louisiana
Films shot in Texas
Wiley College
Harpo Productions films
Metro-Goldwyn-Mayer films
The Weinstein Company films
Films scored by James Newton Howard
Films directed by Denzel Washington
Films produced by Joe Roth
Films produced by Oprah Winfrey
Films about high school debate
Cultural depictions of American men
Cultural depictions of educators
Black people in art
2007 drama films
Films set in universities and colleges
2000s English-language films
2000s American films
English-language drama films